Mates is an English surname, and may refer to:

 Mates (born 1964), British newsreader and journalist
 Michael Mates (born 1934), British politician
 Frederick S. Mates, founded the Mates Investment Fund in 1967 that crashed in the bear market of 1970
 Benson Mates, American philosopher

See also
 Mate (disambiguation)
Mates condoms
Mates (film)
Friendship
Mates by Irvine Sellars, British clothing retail chain